This is a graphical lifespan timeline of heads of state of Romania since 1810.  The heads of state are listed in order of office.

<div style="overflow:auto">

External links
The President of Romania
Romanian Royal Family

Romanian history timelines
Graphical timelines